Rasputin, Demon with Women (German: Rasputin, Dämon der Frauen) is a 1932 German drama film directed by Adolf Trotz and starring Conrad Veidt, Paul Otto and Hermine Sterler.

It portrays the influence wielded by Grigori Rasputin over the Russian Royal Family around the time of the First World War. It was released the same year as an American film about him Rasputin and the Empress.

The film's sets were designed by the art directors Gustav A. Knauer and Walter Reimann.

Cast

References

Bibliography 
 Klaus, Ulrich J. Deutsche Tonfilme: Jahrgang 1932. Klaus-Archiv, 1988.

External links

1932 drama films
1930s historical drama films
Films of the Weimar Republic
German historical drama films
Films directed by Adolf Trotz
Biographical films about Russian royalty
Films set in the 1900s
Films set in the 1910s
Films about Grigori Rasputin
Cultural depictions of Nicholas II of Russia
German black-and-white films
1930s German films